Västerås SK BK Dam is the women's bandy side of the Swedish sports club Västerås SK, located in Västerås. The senior side currently plays in the Swedish Allsvenskan, the top-tier league of Swedish women's bandy, and has done so for a number of years. The club was the runner-up for the Swedish Championship in 2017.

The club was founded on January 29, 1904 and holds its matches at the ABB Arena South. The men's side is Västerås SK Bandy.

In March 2019, the Västerås SK women's bandy team won its first Swedish national championship by defeating Skutskärs IF, 5–3, in the final game following overtime and penalty shootout.

In October 2019 the team won the first women's edition of the Swedish women's bandy national cup competition by defeating Skutskärs IF, med 4–2, in the final game. Later the same month the team also won the World Cup by winning the final game, once again defeating Skutskärs IF, 5–0.

Sources

Bandy clubs in Sweden
Sport in Västmanland County
Västerås SK Bandy